The 2014 FIM Speedway World Cup (SWC) was the fourteenth FIM Speedway World Cup, the annual international speedway world championship tournament. It took place between 26 July and 2 August 2014 and involved nine national teams.

Qualification
 Terenzano - 5 July 2014

Qualified teams

Tournament

Semi finals

Race off

Final 
(full details)

Final classification

See also
 2014 Speedway Grand Prix

References

 
World Team
2014